Frank Krick (June 30, 1910 – May 5, 1982) was an American sprint canoer who competed in the 1950s. Competing in two Summer Olympics, he earned his best finish of fifth in the C-2 10000 m event at Helsinki in 1952.

References

Frank Krick's obituary

1910 births
1982 deaths
American male canoeists
Canoeists at the 1952 Summer Olympics
Canoeists at the 1956 Summer Olympics
Olympic canoeists of the United States